"Over the Mountain; Across the Sea" is a song written by Rex Garvin. The song was a hit for Johnnie & Joe in 1957 and Bobby Vinton in 1963.

"Over the Mountain; Across the Sea" was originally released by Johnnie & Joe in 1957. Johnnie & Joe's version reached No. 8 on Billboards "Top 100 Sides" chart, No. 3 on Billboards chart of "R&B Best Sellers in Stores", and No. 6 on Billboards chart of "Most Played R&B by Jockeys".

Bobby Vinton released a cover of the song in 1963. Vinton's version spent 10 weeks on the Billboard Hot 100 chart, peaking at No. 21, while reaching No. 8 on Billboards Middle-Road Singles chart, and No. 2 on Canada's CHUM Hit Parade.

Skip & Flip released a version of the song as the B-side to their 1962 single "One More Drink for Julie".

In popular culture 

The song was briefly played at the ending of La Bamba, just before the radio announced the death of Ritchie Valens

The Bobby Vinton cover of the song features at the beginning of the 2021 film, Godzilla vs. Kong.

References

1957 songs
1957 singles
1963 singles
Bobby Vinton songs
Skip & Flip songs
Chess Records singles
Epic Records singles
Songs written by Rex Garvin